Patricia Noall (born June 2, 1970) is a former competition swimmer who represented Canada in international swimming championships during the 1980s and early 1990s, competing in freestyle events.  She won 14 medals in international competition, including the Olympics, Pan Pacific Championships, Commonwealth Games, and World University Games.

Noall swam in the 1988 Summer Olympics in Seoul, South Korea.  There she earned bronze medal by swimming for the third-place Canadian team in the preliminary heats of the women's 4x100-metre medley relay, although she just swam.  The Canadian team for the final was formed by Lori Melien, Allison Higson, Jane Kerr and Andrea Nugent.

See also
 List of Olympic medalists in swimming (women)
 List of Commonwealth Games medallists in swimming (women)

References

External links
 
 
 
 
 

1970 births
Living people
Canadian female freestyle swimmers
Commonwealth Games gold medallists for Canada
Commonwealth Games silver medallists for Canada
Commonwealth Games bronze medallists for Canada
Olympic bronze medalists for Canada
Olympic bronze medalists in swimming
Olympic swimmers of Canada
Universiade medalists in swimming
People from Pointe-Claire
Sportspeople from Quebec
Swimmers at the 1986 Commonwealth Games
Swimmers at the 1988 Summer Olympics
Swimmers at the 1990 Commonwealth Games
Medalists at the 1988 Summer Olympics
Commonwealth Games medallists in swimming
Universiade gold medalists for Canada
Universiade silver medalists for Canada
Universiade bronze medalists for Canada
Medalists at the 1991 Summer Universiade
Medallists at the 1986 Commonwealth Games
Medallists at the 1990 Commonwealth Games